Schillinger is the surname of:
 Joseph Schillinger (1895–1943), musician, developer of:
 The Schillinger System, a mathematical method of music composition
 Josef Schillinger (1908–1943), SS officer, killed by Polish Jew Franceska Mann at Auschwitz concentration camp during the Holocaust

Characters on the HBO show Oz:
 Vernon Schillinger
 Andrew Schillinger
 Hank Schillinger

German-language surnames